Jabari Dominic Walker (born July 30, 2002) is an American professional basketball player for the Portland Trail Blazers of the National Basketball Association (NBA). He played college basketball for the Colorado Buffaloes. He was named first-team All-Pac-12 as a sophomore with Colorado.

High school career
Walker played basketball for Campbell Hall School in Los Angeles, California, for three years. For his senior season, he transferred to AZ Compass Prep in Chandler, Arizona. As a senior, he averaged 13 points, 8 rebounds, and 1.5 blocks per game. Walker competed for Dream Vision on the Amateur Athletic Union circuit. He committed to playing college basketball for Colorado over offers from California and Saint Mary's.

College career
On January 14, 2021, Walker recorded 23 points and 11 rebounds in an 89–60 win over California. In February, he missed six games with a foot injury. On March 20, 2021, Walker scored a freshman season-high 24 points, shooting 5-of-5 from three-point range, in a 96–73 victory over Georgetown at the first round of the NCAA tournament. As a freshman, he averaged 7.6 points and 4.3 rebounds per game, earning Pac-12 All-Freshman Team honors. On January 25, 2022, Walker tied a career-high 24 points in a 82–78 win over Oregon. As a sophomore, he averaged 14.6 points and 9.4 rebounds per game and was named first-team All-Pac-12. On March 30, 2022, Walker declared for the 2022 NBA draft while maintaining his college eligibility. He later signed with an agent, forgoing his remaining eligibility.

Professional career 

Walker was selected with the 57th overall pick in the 2022 NBA draft by the Portland Trail Blazers. He joined the Blazers' 2022 NBA Summer League team. In his Summer League debut, Walker recorded eleven points and seven rebounds in an 81–78 loss to the Detroit Pistons. On July 13, 2022, Walker signed his rookie scale contract with the Trail Blazers.

Career statistics

College

|-
| style="text-align:left;"| 2020–21
| style="text-align:left;"| Colorado
| 26 || 0 || 14.2 || .526 || .523 || .778 || 4.3 || .5 || .5 || .5 || 7.6
|-
| style="text-align:left;"| 2021–22
| style="text-align:left;"| Colorado
| 33 || 33 || 28.1 || .461 || .346 || .784 || 9.4 || 1.2 || .7 || .7 || 14.6
|- class="sortbottom"
| style="text-align:center;" colspan="2"| Career
|| 59 || 33 || 22.0 || .479 || .399 || .783 || 7.2 || .9 || .6 || .6 || 11.5

Personal life
Walker's father, Samaki, played in the National Basketball Association for 10 years. He has two siblings who play college basketball: his brother, Dibaji, at UMass, and his sister, Sakima, at Rutgers.

References

External links
Colorado Buffaloes bio
USA Basketball bio

2002 births
Living people
American men's basketball players
Basketball players from Wichita, Kansas
Basketball players from Inglewood, California
Colorado Buffaloes men's basketball players
Portland Trail Blazers draft picks
Portland Trail Blazers players
Power forwards (basketball)